Raymond P. Ward is an American politician and physician serving as a member of the Utah House of Representatives from the 19th district. Elected in November 2014, he assumed office on January 1, 2015.

Education 
Ward earned a Bachelor of Science degree from Brigham Young University, followed by a PhD in pharmacology and Doctor of Medicine from the University of Washington School of Medicine.

Career 
Ward works as a family physician at Cope Family Medicine. He was first elected to the Utah House of Representatives in 2014 and began serving on January 1, 2015.

Representative Ward currently serves on the Social Services Appropriations Subcommittee, the House Health and Human Services Committee, House Transportation Committee, the Legislative Process Committee, and the Education and Mental Health Coordinating Council.

Sponsored legislation

Elections 
 2014: Ward defeated Chet Loftis in the Republican convention and faced the Democratic Party nominee Daniel Donahue and Independent American Party nominee Eli Cawley in the general election. Ward won with 7,755 votes (74.5%).

Personal life 
Representative Ward lives in Bountiful, Utah with his wife Beverly and three children.

References 

Republican Party members of the Utah House of Representatives
University of Phoenix alumni
Weber State University alumni
American Latter Day Saints
Living people
1950 births
21st-century American politicians